Ray Harryhausen: Special Effects Titan is a 2011 documentary film on the life and work of Ray Harryhausen.

Production
The film was made over a 10-year period and features interviews and tributes from filmmakers who were inspired by his work. 

The film included footage from the 1990 documentary Ray Harryhausen: Movement Into Life made at the time by film student John Walsh.

Interviewees
The animators, directors, actors and special effects artists interviewed for the film were:

 Peter Jackson
 Terry Gilliam
 Guillermo del Toro
 James Cameron
 Tim Burton
 Ray Harryhausen
 John Landis
 Henry Selick
 Ray Bradbury
 Nick Park
 Randy Cook
 Phil Tippett
 Steven Spielberg
 Dennis Muren
 Steven Johnson
 Joe Dante
 Vincenzo Natali
 John Lasseter
 Ken Ralston
 Robert Townson
 Christopher Young
 John Cairney
 Greg Broadmore
 Andrew Jones
 Martine Beswick
 Vanessa Harryhausen
 Caroline Munro

Release
The film was shown at the Paris International Fantastic Film Festival on November 27, 2011.

Reception
The Observer described the documentary as a "a riveting film by a French movie historian" and that it was "A continual delight." The Financial Times  noted that specific scenes in the film, such as the tours of Harryhausen's workshop, and noted that "Perhaps the most fascinating point made in the film is that it was Harryhausen who invented the way we all think dinosaurs moved. Those gestures - agreed on now even by palaeontologists - actually first came from him." Michael Brooke writing for Sight and Sound described the film as "clearly a labour of love by all concerned" and an "*immensely engaging portrait of [Harryhausen]." He concluded that the film was "undoubtedly a hagiography, but noted the terms linguistic origin meaning "a saint's biography"."

References

External links
 

Documentary films about visual artists
Documentary films about animation
2011 documentary films
2011 films
French documentary films
Works about Ray Harryhausen
2010s French films